Tubular carcinoma is a subtype of invasive ductal carcinoma of the breast. More rarely, tubular carcinomas may arise in the pancreas or kidney. Most tubular carcinomas begin in the milk duct of the breast and spread to healthy tissue around it.

Pathology 

Although tubular carcinoma has been considered a special-type tumor, recent trend has been to classify it as a low-grade, invasive NOS carcinoma because there is a continuous spectrum from pure tubular carcinomas to mixed NOS carcinomas with tubular features, depending on the percentage of the lesion that displays tubular features.

Histology 

Tubular carcinomas are generally around 1 cm. or smaller, and are made up of tubules. They are usually low-grade. Elastosis has been noted as common but is not present in all cases.

Prevalence 

Prevalence has previously been controversial, with contradictory reports from studies reporting either very low prevalence, or a high prevalence. With the increasing availability of screening mammography, however, tubular carcinomas are being diagnosed earlier, and more recent studies suggest tubular carcinomas represent between 8% and 27% of all breast cancers.

Prognosis 

Tubular carcinoma is one of the histologic types of breast cancer with a more favorable outcome.

See also 

 Breast cancer classification
 Ductal carcinoma in situ – a common precancerous or Stage 0 breast cancer
 Invasive cribriform carcinoma of the breast – a rare breast cancer that consists of >50% cribriform histopathology but commonly has small or large areas (<50%) closely resembling tubular carcinoma histopathology.  
 Intraductal papillary mucinous neoplasm
 Invasive carcinoma of no special type
 Invasive lobular carcinoma
 Invasion (cancer)

Notes and references 
Notes

References

Further reading 
 
 
 
 

Breast cancer
Carcinoma